A Wisconsin dairy barn is a style of barn developed presumably in the U.S. state of Wisconsin, but present in other U.S. states, especially further west.

"The introduction of the Wisconsin Dairy Barn, which was actively promoted by the University of Wisconsin School of Agriculture, incorporated the scientific knowledge of the turn-of-the-[20th-]century. Ample light and ventilation, a gambrel roof to increase storage space for hay, built-in manure and hay tracks, and poured concrete floors for sanitation, all reflected the technological requirements necessary to run a modern dairy operation."

Wisconsin dairy barns became popular in Ohio.

Notable examples include:
University of Wisconsin Dairy Barn (1897), 1915 Linden Dr., Madison, Wisconsin
Olaf Stordahl Barn (1918), Kingsbury County, South Dakota 
Hoffman Barn (1920), Deuel County, South Dakota

See also
Wisconsin dairy industry
Gothic arch barn, with even bigger open space for hay
New England barn
Pennsylvania barn
Bank barn

References

Barns
Vernacular architecture